Ekspress Meedia is an Estonian media company.

In 2015, companies Eesti Ajalehed and Delfi (sister companies of Ekspress Grupp) were merged into one company called Ekspress Meedia.

The company are publishing these Estonian newspapers and magazines: Eesti Ekspress, Maaleht, Eesti Päevaleht, Laupäevaleht LP, Anne & Stiil, Eesti Naine, Oma Maitse, Kroonika, Tervis Pluss, Maakodu, Jana, Pere ja Kodu.

The company owns also news portal "Delfi".

From September 1, 2022, the company will be called Delfi Meedia.

References

External links
 

Mass media in Estonia
Companies of Estonia